The Worcester Fire Department (WFD) provides fire protection and emergency medical services to the city of Worcester, Massachusetts.

Stations and Apparatus
Below is a complete listing of all WFD fire station locations and fire companies in the city of Worcester according to District. The Southbridge, Grove Street and Franklin Fire Stations have 2 Engine Companies. Ladder 2 and Ladder 5 are Tiller Ladders. Ladder 3 and Ladder 7 are Tower Ladder Trucks. Ladders 4, 1, and 6 are Regular Aerial trucks.

Disbanded Fire Companies
Throughout the history of the Worcester Fire Department, several fire companies have been disbanded.
 Engine 1 - Central St. & Major Taylor Blvd. - Disbanded 2007
 Engine 10 - 424 Park Ave. - Disbanded 2007
 Engine 14 - Cambridge St. & McKeon Rd. - Disbanded 1991

Notable incidents

Worcester Cold Storage and Warehouse fire 

On December 3, 1999, six firefighters were killed at the Worcester Cold Storage Warehouse fire. The fire occurred at 6:13 p.m. in an abandoned cold storage warehouse at Box 1438, 266 Franklin Street. Six Worcester firefighters died while looking for two homeless victims thought to be trapped in the blaze. The fire went to five alarms and took six days to bring under control. Those killed were: 
Lieutenant Thomas Spencer, 42, Ladder 2
Firefighter Paul Brotherton, 41, Rescue 1
Firefighter Jeremiah Lucey, 38, Rescue 1 
Firefighter Timothy Jackson, 51, Ladder 2 
Firefighter James Lyons, 34, Engine 3 
Firefighter Joseph McGuirk, 38, Engine 3
Services for the firefighters were held in the DCU Center (then called Worcester's Centrum Centre). The funeral procession was broadcast on several national news networks and was attended by President Bill Clinton, Vice President Al Gore, Senator Ted Kennedy and Senator John Kerry (who flew non-stop from Burma, where he had been attending a diplomatic function). Also in the procession were firefighters from around the United States, Canada, and from Dublin, Ireland.

Because his cousin, FF. Lucey, and high school friend, Lt. Spencer were killed in the fire, actor/comedian Denis Leary, a Worcester native, started the Leary Firefighters Foundation in 2000 to give aid and support to many fire departments, particularly those suffering from budget shortfalls by providing them with new equipment.

References

External links 

 Official Website
 IAFF Local 1009 - Worcester Firefighter's Union
 Worcester 6 Memorial Website
 Box 4 Special Services Canteen Association

Fire departments in Massachusetts
Fire